Máximo Valverde (born 16 November 1944) is a Spanish actor. He appeared in more than sixty films since 1968.

Selected filmography
 1970: The Wind's Fierce
 1971: Una chica casi decente
 1971: The Rebellious Novice
 1971: Spaniards in Paris
 1972: Tragic Ceremony as Joe
 1973: No es bueno que el hombre esté solo as Mauro
 1975: Clara is the Price
 1977: Hotel Fear
 1978: Bermuda: Cave of the Sharks
 1984: The Cheerful Colsada Girls as Juan Luis

References

External links 

1944 births
Living people
Spanish male film actors